Fred Patrick Henning (July 5, 1908 – April 28, 1973) was an American character actor, best known for playing Kayo Dugan in On The Waterfront (1954).

Filmography

References

External links

1908 births
1973 deaths
20th-century American male actors
American male film actors